Song of Spring (Italian: Canzone di primavera) is a 1950 Italian melodrama film directed by Mario Costa and starring Leonardo Cortese, Delia Scala and Tamara Lees.

The film's sets were designed by Alberto Boccianti.

Partial cast
Leonardo Cortese as Mario  
 Delia Scala as Rosetta  
 Tamara Lees as Evi  
 Claudio Villa as himself  
 Laura Gore as Maria  
 Aroldo Tieri as Nino  
 Ludmilla Dudarova as Elena  
 Checco Durante as Pippo  
 Dante Maggio as Gigetto  
 Paola Borboni as Lidia  
 Arturo Bragaglia 
 Piero Lulli as Ugo  
 Enrico Glori 
 Franco Pesce 
 Jone Morino as Fanny 
 Felice Romano 
 Giuseppe Pierozzi 
 Aldo Silvani
 Vittorio Sanipoli as Max

References

Bibliography
 Pasquale Sorrenti. Il cinema e la Puglia. Schena, 1984.

External links 
 

1951 films
Italian black-and-white films
1950s Italian-language films
1951 drama films
Films directed by Mario Costa
Italian drama films
Melodrama films
1950s Italian films